SS Byron was a transatlantic ocean liner that was built in England in 1914 and scrapped in Italy in 1937. She was launched as Vasilefs Constantinos, named after Constantine I of Greece. In 1919 she was renamed Megali Hellas, the Greek name for the Ancient Greek settlements in Sicily and southern Italy. In 1923 she was renamed Byron, in recognition of the role of Lord Byron (1788–1824) in the Greek War of Independence (1821–29).

Throughout her career the ship was owned by the National Steam Navigation Company, Ltd, of Greece. However, France requisitioned her as a troop ship in 1918, and her Greek owners registered her in the United Kingdom from 1923 until 1928.

The ship was small compared with the great transatlantic liners of her era. But even in the 1930s she was the largest ship in the Greek merchant fleet.

Building
Cammell, Laird & Co built Vasilefs Constantinos in Birkenhead on the River Mersey as yard number 800. She was launched on 9 June 1914 and completed that December.

Vasilefs Constantinos had berths for 60 First Class, 450 Second Class and 1,800 Third Class passengers, and had a crew of 300. Her holds had capacity for 4,000 tons of cargo.

Vasilefs Constantinos had twin screws, each powered by a quadruple expansion engine.

The National Steam Navigation Company registered Vasilefs Constantinos on the Aegean island of Andros. Her code letters were HQLG.

Vasilefs Constantinos
On 13 May 1915 Vasilefs Constantinos left Piraeus on her maiden voyage, which was via Patras and Naples to New York. On the afternoon of 28 May US authorities held her for four hours at a quarantine station outside New York because she had a case of suspected typhus aboard. She was allowed to dock at Jersey City later that evening, but passengers were not allowed to disembark until 29 May because United States Customs Service officers were not in position until then.

Greece was neutral in early part of the First World War. Then in September 1915 the Bulgarian Army mobilised against Serbia, and Greece responded by mobilising the Hellenic Army. Thousands of Hellenic Army reservists living in the USA sought to travel to Greece to join the mobilisation. On 12 October Vasilefs Constantinos left Jersey City carrying 2,637 passengers, most of whom were Greek reservists. Her steerage was so crowded that her cargo was limited to 1,000 tons instead of her usual 4,000.

Within hours of leaving port the ship was recalled, reportedly over a dispute between the Greek government and her managers as to how much the government would pay the company for the reservists' passage to Greece. She anchored at the quarantine station until 16 October, when she finally departed eastward across the Atlantic.

On 6 August 1916 Vasilefs Constantinos reached Jersey City carrying 1,991 passengers, most of whom were immigrants from Greece or refugees from the Central Powers' invasion and occupation of Serbia. On 9 September she left Piraeus on her eleventh return trip to Jersey City. After this voyage, her transatlantic service seems to have been interrupted.

By 1918 Vasilefs Constantinos was equipped for wireless telegraphy. Her call sign was SVV.

In 1918 France requisitioned Vasilefs Constantinos as a troop ship. In 1919 she was returned to her owners.

Megali Hellas
In 1919 the ship was renamed Megali Hellas, which is the Greek name for Magna Graecia in Sicily and southern Italy.

On 3 March 1921 the ship ran aground off Kumkale, at the mouth of the Dardanelles. She was refloated in 8 March.

One source states that Megali Hellas resumed service on her route between Piraeus and New York via Patras and Naples on 12 October 1919. However, on 30 May 1921 The New York Times welcomed the return of the ship to New York the previous day "after an absence of seven years". Her passengers on that 1921 voyage included 200 picture brides.

On 29 July 1921, US authorities detained Megali Hellas off Sandy Hook, New Jersey because Greece had used up its immigration quota for that month under the Emergency Quota Act. She was not allowed into port until 1 August.

On 1 October 1921 Megali Hellas reached New York carrying 715 passengers, including 200 Greek brides-to-be who had traveled to marry men in the USA. US immigration authorities allowed no-one to disembark except holders of US or diplomatic passports. The authorities ruled that all 378 steerage passengers would be taken to Ellis Island, held there and deported.

Byron
In 1923 the National Steam Navigation Company founded a UK subsidiary, the Byron Steam Ship Company. In 1924 it transferred Megali Hellas to the new company, renamed her Byron, and changed her port of registration to London. Her UK official number was 147667 and her UK code letters were KQTP.

On 12 January 1923 Byron started serving a revised route between Istanbul and New York via Piraeus, Patras and Marseille. From 4 August 1923 this route was extended to Constanța in Romania.

Cargo fire
On 5 October 1926 Byron was approaching New York, carrying 697 passengers from Europe. Her crew fought the fire, but it soon disabled her steam-powered steering gear, so she had to be steered by hand.

At about 0600 Byron she embarked a pilot as normal to take her into port. Her wireless telegraphist sent a distress signal, requesting tugboats and fireboats to assist her.

The naval wireless station at The Battery received Byrons signal. The pair pumped water into the burning hold. Byrons boilers and engines continued to work, and she reached the quarantine station under her own power, assisted by two tugs.

Final years
In 1928 Byron returned to the direct ownership of the National Steam Navigation Company, which changed her port of registration back to Andros. Her new Greek code letters were to JGPH. By 1934 her call sign was SVAG.

On 2 October 1935 Byron left Piraeus on what turned out to be her final voyage to New York. She called at Lisbon on her outward journey, and Boston, the Azores and Lisbon on her return. The Greek government then withdrew her subsidy, and the National Steam Navigation Company went bankrupt.

On 20 February 1937 Byron left Piraeus for the last time. She sailed to La Spezia in northern Italy, where she was scrapped.

References

Bibliography

1914 ships
Maritime incidents in 1921
Maritime incidents in 1926
Ocean liners
Passenger ships of Greece
Passenger ships of the United Kingdom
Ships built on the River Mersey
Steamships of Greece
Steamships of the United Kingdom
Troop ships
World War I merchant ships of Greece